Gymnocalycium paraguayense is a species of Gymnocalycium from Paraguay.

References

External links
 
 

paraguayense
Flora of Paraguay
Plants described in 1971